"A Different Beat" is a song by Irish boy band Boyzone from their second studio album of the same name (1996). The song was written by Ronan Keating, Stephen Gately, Shane Lynch, Keith Duffy, Martin Brannigan, and Ray Hedges, and it was produced by Hedges with additional production by Trevor Horn on the radio edit. It was released as the album's second single on 2 December 1996 by Polydor Records, becoming their only UK number-one hit to be co-written by members of the group.

Critical reception
A reviewer from Music Week rated the song four out of five, describing it as a "dramatic epic, enriched by African chants". Gerald Martinez from New Sunday Times viewed it as "anthemic".

Track listings
 UK CD1 and Australian CD single
 "A Different Beat" (radio edit) – 3:34
 "Angel" – 3:45
 "A Different Beat" (remix) – 6:10

 UK CD2
 "A Different Beat" (radio edit) – 3:34
 "Angel" – 3:45
 "Key to My Life" (live at Wembley) – 4:12
 "A Different Beat" (remix) – 6:10

 UK cassette and European CD single
 "A Different Beat" (radio edit) – 3:52 (3:24 on European CD)
 "Angel" – 3:45

Charts

Weekly charts

Year-end charts

Certifications

References

1996 singles
1996 songs
Boyzone songs
Number-one singles in Scotland
Polydor Records singles
Song recordings produced by Ray Hedges
Song recordings produced by Trevor Horn
Songs written by Keith Duffy
Songs written by Martin Brannigan
Songs written by Ray Hedges
Songs written by Ronan Keating
Songs written by Shane Lynch
Songs written by Stephen Gately